Iain Thomas Rankin  (born April 9, 1983)  is a Canadian politician who served as the 29th premier of Nova Scotia from February 23, 2021, to August 31, 2021. He serves in the Nova Scotia House of Assembly for the Nova Scotia Liberal Party, representing the electoral district of Timberlea-Prospect . Rankin was first elected in the 2013 Nova Scotia general election and was re-elected in the 2017 general election. On February 6, 2021, Rankin was announced the Leader of the Nova Scotia Liberal Party.

On February 23, 2021, Rankin became the 29th premier of Nova Scotia. Rankin called an election for August 17, 2021, which his Liberal Party lost to the Progressive Conservative Party of Nova Scotia. Rankin left office as Premier on August 31, 2021, when Houston took the oath. At that time, Rankin became the Leader of the Opposition in the Nova Scotia House of Assembly.

On January 5, 2022, Rankin announced that he will resign as leader of the Nova Scotia Liberal Party once a new leader is chosen.

Early life and education
Ian Thomas Rankin was born in Inverness, Nova Scotia, and grew up in Timberlea. He is the son of long-term Halifax city councillor Reg Rankin. Rankin graduated from Sir John A. Macdonald High School in 2001.
He received a diploma in Professional Golf Management from Holland College, a Bachelor of Business Administration from Mount Saint Vincent University in 2006 and a Masters of Arts in International Politics at CERIS-ULB Diplomatic School of Brussels.

Before entering politics, Iain was employed as an operations manager and as a project manager. He was the Director of Operations for Dymon Storage Corporation, in Ottawa, Ontario. After returning to Nova Scotia in 2011, Iain successfully managed the launch, as an operating partner, of Premiere Self Storage, in Dartmouth, Nova Scotia. He went on to work as a project manager in the commercial division of Armco Capital, focusing on redevelopment assignments in Nova Scotia and Quebec.

Advocacy
Rankin, a rescue dog owner, supported the Nova Scotia government's plan to outlaw tying pets up for longer than 12 hours. In 2014 with the support of local residents, Rankin participated in a campaign with lawn signs targeting speeders with a message to slow down. Through a private member's bill and was passed by the legislature, Rankin submitted Bill 176 which will restrict Otter Lake Waste Facility to its current height and size.

Rankin participated in a virtual event commemorating the 100th anniversary of the Nova Scotia Home for Colored Children in June 2021, speaking alongside  MLA Tony Ince, Senator Wanda Thomas Bernard, Judge Corrine Sparks and Rev. Rhonda Britton.

Political career
Rankin first ran for public office in the 2013 Nova Scotia general election and was elected to the Nova Scotia House of Assembly. During his first term, he served as the Liberal caucus chair. He was vice-chair of the public accounts committee, and a member of the assembly matters and the private and local bills committees. He was also a member of the House of Assembly Management Commission.

In 2014, Rankin was elected president of the provincial section of the Francophone Parliamentarian Association, when the membership broke from tradition by not electing an opposition party member.

In 2015, Rankin chaired an all-Party working group established by the Committee on Assembly Matters. He introduced a motion to approve the Nova Scotia House of Assembly policy on prevention and resolution of harassment in the workplace, drafted by the all-Party working group established by this committee on September 28, 2015.

In April, of 2016, Rankin appeared at the Community Services Standing Committee and introduced a motion asking that full funding for the Nova Scotia Association for Community Living (NSACL) be reinstated.

In November, of 2016, after the submissions were heard at Law Amendments Committee, Rankin proposed a motion to stand The Accessibility Act for further consultation, quoted as saying "We have a moral obligation to get this bill right."

During Rankin's time at Law Amendments Committee, Bill 59 (the Accessibility Act) was amended after witnesses appeared and staff consulted with representatives of persons with disabilities. It was moved to the Department of Justice and passed, in April, of 2017, with the intent of making the province accessible by 2030.

On June 15, 2017, Rankin was appointed to the Executive Council of Nova Scotia as Minister of Environment.  Rankin hired the first dedicated crown prosecutor to handle cases related to the Environment Act, food safety, public health, meat inspection, fisheries and aquaculture, animal welfare, natural resources and the fur industry. Rankin passed legislation to introduce a cap and trade system in Nova Scotia. As Minister of Environment, Rankin joined other leaders across the continent agreeing to regional cooperation on carbon pricing in the Americas. Rankin signed an agreement to join the Western Climate Initiative Inc. to use its IT system to manage and track the new cap and trade program. In order to define a coastal protection zone in the province, Rankin launched public consultations on future coastal protection legislation which passed in the legislature. Calling the toxic Boat Harbour lagoon one of the worst examples of environmental racism in the province and possibly the country, Rankin announced details of a long-awaited clean up at Northern Pulp's wastewater lagoon, on the edge of Pictou Landing First Nation. It is Nova Scotia's biggest environmental remediation project since the Sydney Tar Ponds. He commissioned an assessment of a contaminated site in Harrietsfield. For years, many residents have not been able to drink their water due to contaminants from a former salvage yard. This was an unprecedented step never used before with the Environment Act.

On July 5, 2018, Rankin was moved to Minister of Lands and Forestry in a cabinet shuffle. While Minister of Lands and Forestry, Rankin secured $47.9 million to clean up two former gold mines in what was the beginning of a project to evaluate and clean up all of the abandoned mine sites in Nova Scotia. The Department of Lands and Forestry committed $1 million to create The Shaw Wilderness Park 153-hectare (379-acre) nature reserve in the Williams Lake area of Halifax. Rankin signed the first ever Mi'kmaq Forest Initiative giving the Mi’kmaq forest planning and management responsibility on two blocks of Crown land, totalling about twenty-thousand hectares.

Rankin resigned from cabinet in October 2020 and announced his candidacy for the leadership of the Nova Scotia Liberal Party.

2021 Liberal leadership contest 
On October 5, 2020, Rankin launched his campaign for Leadership of the Nova Scotia Liberal Party, following Premier Stephen McNeil's announcement that he would be stepping down from his office. The other candidates in this contest were fellow former cabinet ministers Randy Delorey and Labi Kousoulis.

Rankin ran on a policy platform comprising five pillars: 
 smart investments in infrastructure; 
 modernized health care;
 an equitable economic recovery;
 bold climate action; and 
 social and racial justice.

On February 6, 2021, Rankin was announced the Leader of the Nova Scotia Liberal Party, and premier-designate of Nova Scotia.

Premier of Nova Scotia 
On February 23, 2021, Iain Rankin became the 29th Premier of Nova Scotia, succeeding Stephen McNeil following a competitive leadership election. Following his election, he called a legislative session to pursue his legislative agenda, including an increase of $100 a month for all adults on income assistance, the largest single increase in the program's history by a large margin, and efforts to address systemic racism and advance equality issues. These included passage of the Emancipation Day Act, which formally recognizes the day the British Parliament abolished slavery, and the Land Titles Initiative Acceleration Act, a bill that will help speed up the process of settling land titles for people living in historically Black communities. Rankin also appointed Andrea Anderson as the province's public service commissioner, the first person of colour to head the commission.

The Environment Department was renamed Environment and Climate Change to highlight Rankin's commitment to the issue, and all mandate letters to ministers noted the need to consider climate change and for it to factor into their respective policy and program decisions.

Rankin created new Offices for Equity and Anti-Racism Initiatives, as well as Mental Health and Addictions.

The new Office of Mental Health and Addictions included new mental health programming, including single brief intervention sessions to provide rapid access to mental health supports, e-mental health options to increase access for Nova Scotians to services and supports, and withdrawal management hubs to support Nova Scotians with substance-related harm and addictions. Dr. Sam Hickcox was appointed as the first chief officer of the newly created Office of Mental Health and Addictions. Rankin committed to opening the withdrawal management sites across the whole province, characterized as "doing more to help addicts than any other government in the last 20 years." The first of several opened in January, of 2022, after Rankin left government.

Through the new Office of Equity and Anti-Racism Initiatives, Rankin announced the creation of a working group that would help with race-based data collection. The data would be used to help improve equity, inclusion and diversity in health care and address racism.

During his time in government, Rankin also committed to creating an independent housing entity and to look at modernizing laws and regulations around housing.

In recognition of Mi’kmaq people, language, and the significant geographical location, Rankin (who renamed the Department of Aboriginal Affairs to L’nu Affairs), unveiled a new sign in Mi’kmaq, Pjila’si Unama’kik at the causeway in Cape Breton, along with Mi’kmaq elders and chiefs.

The Rankin government invested $5 million to help make the sports more inclusive and accessible. The biggest investment in community and amateur sport in recent history.

Former premier Rodney MacDonald joined Rankin in Mabou to announce the creation of a satellite campus in Mabou for the Gaelic College, called Beinn Mhabu. The province invested 1.92 million to renovate St Joseph’s convent. It is expected to open in 2022 and include programming and accommodations.

On his first day in office, Rankin announced incentives for the purchase of electric vehicles as well as energy efficiency support for low-income Nova Scotians. In his throne speech, Rankin announced a bold commitment to get Nova Scotia off coal by 2030, ten years earlier than previously planned. Rankin launched a plan to add 264 new long-term care beds and replace 1,298 beds at 14 nursing homes and three residential care facilities across the province. To help address systemic racism in the justice system Rankin announced $4.8 million to establish the African Nova Scotian Justice Institute. Rankin signed a $645 million agreement with the federal government to establish $10 per day childcare in Nova Scotia.

In April 2021, following a spike in COVID-19 cases, Rankin enacted lockdown measures which brought case numbers down, and case numbers remained low for the remainder of his tenure. Nova Scotia maintained the highest vaccination rates in Canada.

In June 2021, with the Liberal government enjoying a 75% approval rating, Rankin called for an election. While the Liberals focused on their handling of the COVID-19 pandemic, the Progressive Conservatives ran a campaign that was largely focused on the ongoing Healthcare crisis in Nova Scotia. Despite starting the campaign with a lead of 28 points in the polls, support for the Liberals collapsed in the final days of the race, and the Progressive Conservatives, led by Tim Houston, won a strong majority government. This marked the first time since 2006 that the Progressive Conservatives had won an election in Nova Scotia. Rankin claimed responsibility for the loss, and said he would do nothing differently.

On January 5, 2022, Rankin announced that he will resign as leader of the Nova Scotia Liberal Party once a new leader is chosen.

Personal life
Rankin was convicted of impaired driving in 2003, and again faced impaired driving charges in 2005 but these were eventually overturned on a technicality due to a clerical error. He is married to Mary Chisholm. Rankin and Chisholm have a daughter, Freya Rose Rankin, born in November 2021.

Bills introduced

Electoral record

|-

|}

References

External links
 Government of Nova Scotia

Living people
Nova Scotia Liberal Party MLAs
People from Inverness County, Nova Scotia
Mount Saint Vincent University alumni
1983 births
21st-century Canadian politicians
Members of the Executive Council of Nova Scotia
Nova Scotia political party leaders